The diving competition at the 1978 Commonwealth Games in Edmonton, Alberta, Canada counted a total number of four medal events: two events for both men and women.

Canada, as host nation, won the most medals, taking 8, of which 2 were gold. They had a clean sweep of all medals in the women's 3 metre springboard event.

Originally, Linda Cuthbert qualified for the springboard event and Beverly Boys qualified for the highboard platform, but decided on a late swap to increase their chances of success. The youngest competitor from Canada competing in the commonwealth games was 18-year-old diver David Snively, then considered "one of Canada's top divers".

In the women's 3 metre springboard event, Janet Nutter led all the competitors after the first six dives with 264.27 points, despite battling a cold and laryngitis.

Medal table

Medalists

Results

Men

Women

References
Citations

Sources
 

1978
1978 in water sports
1978 Commonwealth Games events